Kakhovka is a rural locality (a selo) and the administrative center of Kakhovsky Selsoviet of Romnensky District, Amur Oblast, Russia. The population was 313 as of 2018. There are 4 streets.

Geography 
Kakhovka is located 11 km north of Romny (the district's administrative centre) by road. Seredinnoye is the nearest rural locality.

References 

Rural localities in Romnensky District